Sheila Y. Oliver (born July 14, 1952) is an American politician serving as the second lieutenant governor of New Jersey since 2018. She previously served in the New Jersey General Assembly from 2004 to 2018, where she represented the 34th legislative district while also serving as the Speaker of the New Jersey General Assembly for two terms, from January 12, 2010, to January 14, 2014, as a member of the Democratic Party.

In July 2017, Phil Murphy, the Democratic Party nominee for governor, selected Oliver as his running mate for lieutenant governor in the November 2017 election. The Murphy/Oliver ticket won the general election. Oliver was sworn in as lieutenant governor on January 16, 2018. The Murphy/Oliver ticket won re-election in November 2021.

Early life and education
Oliver was born and raised in Newark, New Jersey, where she graduated from Weequahic High School in 1970. Oliver graduated cum laude with a B.A. from Lincoln University in 1974 in Sociology and was awarded an M.S. from Columbia University in planning and administration in 1976. On May 6, 2018, Oliver received the honorary degree of Doctor of Humane Letters from Lincoln University.

Career
Oliver worked in both the public and private sectors, including serving as executive director of The Leaguers, Inc., a northern New Jersey non-profit social services organization. She also taught at the college level, including serving as an adjunct faculty member at Essex County College and Caldwell University.

She served on the Board of Education of the East Orange School District from 1994 to 2000, and was chosen by her peers to serve as its Vice President from 1998 to 1999 and President from 1999 to 2000. She served on the Essex County Board of Chosen Freeholders from district 3 for one term from 1996 to 1999, but was defeated for a second term on the board in the June 1999 Democratic primary election. In 1997, she became the first woman to launch a competitive campaign for mayor in the City of East Orange, losing the election by a mere 51 votes to Robert L. Bowser.

Oliver was one of the founders of the Newark Coalition for Low Income Housing, an organization that successfully sued the Newark Housing Authority and the United States Department of Housing and Urban Development in federal court to block the demolition of all publicly subsidized low income housing in Newark, as there was no plan in place for the construction of replacement housing for low-income Newark residents. As a result, the Newark Housing Authority was directed by a federal consent order to build one-for-one replacement housing for low-income residents.

New Jersey State Assembly
As a part of intra-party deal making in 2003, Oliver was chosen alongside incumbent Assemblyman Peter C. Eagler to be the party-backed candidates in the June 2003 primary election for General Assembly from the 34th district. Incumbent Assemblyman Willis Edwards was dropped from the ticket as a result. Until she ran for lieutenant governor, she had been re-elected six times to two-year terms in every cycle after her initial election in 2003.

On November 23, 2009, Oliver was elected unanimously by Assembly Democrats to become the 169th Speaker of the Assembly. Her election made her the second woman to serve as Speaker in New Jersey history, the first being Marion West Higgins, who served in 1965, and the second African American to hold this post, the first being S. Howard Woodson, who first held the post in 1974. Nationwide, she became the second African American woman to lead a state legislature after Karen Bass of California.

As Speaker, Oliver backed Governor Chris Christie's reforms to public workers' pensions and benefits. Police and Fire unions were furious with the Speaker, claiming that she told them the issue was still under consideration before announcing the bill would be introduced later that same day. Then-Assemblyman Joseph Cryan was unsuccessful in his efforts to convince his fellow Democrats to stage a coup against reappointing Oliver as Speaker. Oliver was elected in 2011 for a second term as Speaker under the terms of a deal in which she agreed to move legislation forward only with the advance support of 41 of the Democrats in the Assembly.

On June 10, 2013, she formally announced that she would run in the special election for the senate seat held by Frank Lautenberg. She did not win any county endorsements in the special primary held on August 13 and came in last of four candidates winning only four percent of the vote.

Oliver served in the Assembly on the Commerce and Economic Development Committee, the Transportation and Independent Authorities Committee, the Joint Committee on Economic Justice and Equal Employment Opportunity, and the Joint Committee on the Public Schools. Oliver remained speaker for the 2012–13 session through a deal made with Senator Nicholas Sacco, Essex County Executive Joseph N. DiVincenzo Jr., and South Jersey political boss George Norcross. Two years later, most Assembly Democrats backed Vincent Prieto for Speaker in the next session. In the 2014–15 Assembly term, Oliver was designated Speaker Emeritus.

Outside of the Legislature, Oliver worked as an assistant administrator for Essex County. She is a resident of East Orange.

Lieutenant governor 
In July 2017, NJ.com first reported Phil Murphy would select Oliver as the Democratic Party candidate for lieutenant governor of New Jersey. Murphy and Oliver defeated the Republican ticket of Lieutenant Governor Kim Guadagno and Mayor Carlos Rendo of Woodcliff Lake. She became the fourth African American woman to become a lieutenant governor in America, and the first of which to be a Democrat. Murphy announced he would appoint Oliver to serve as commissioner of the Department of Community Affairs, a cabinet appointment, made under a provision of the New Jersey Constitution that allows the governor to appoint his lieutenant governor to a cabinet post without requiring the approval of the New Jersey Senate. She is the first black woman to serve as Lieutenant Governor of New Jersey, and the first woman of color elected to statewide office in New Jersey.

New Jersey law allows for someone to run for two elective offices simultaneously, but they cannot serve in both offices simultaneously and must pick their desired seat. Oliver, in addition to being elected Lieutenant Governor of New Jersey, also won re-election to her legislative seat in the General Assembly. Oliver had to resign her legislative seat by noon on January 16, 2018, the date she and Murphy were sworn in. When Carlos Rendo, during their one televised debate, challenged her decision to run for both seats, Oliver said that she had filed to run for re-election before she was chosen by Murphy as his running mate and would resign from her Assembly seat if she and Murphy were elected. After Oliver resigned her Assembly seat, she was replaced by Britnee Timberlake, who had served as the Freeholder President of the Essex County Board of Chosen Freeholders and was sworn into office on January 29, 2018.

Electoral history

See also
 List of female lieutenant governors in the United States
 List of female speakers of legislatures in the United States
 List of minority governors and lieutenant governors in the United States

References

Further reading
New Jersey Legislature Financial Disclosure Forms: 2016 2015 2014 2013 2012 2011 2010 2009 2008 2007 2006 2005 2004
New Jersey Voter Information Website 2003 (archived)

External links

Lt. Governor and Commissioner of Community Affairs Sheila Oliver government website

|-

|-

1952 births
21st-century American politicians
21st-century American women politicians
African-American state cabinet secretaries
African-American state legislators in New Jersey
African-American women in politics
Columbia University alumni
Commissioners of the New Jersey Department of Community Affairs
County commissioners in New Jersey
Housing rights activists
Lieutenant Governors of New Jersey
Lincoln University (Pennsylvania) alumni
Living people
Politicians from East Orange, New Jersey
Politicians from Newark, New Jersey
Speakers of the New Jersey General Assembly
Democratic Party members of the New Jersey General Assembly
Weequahic High School alumni
Women state legislators in New Jersey
21st-century African-American women
21st-century African-American politicians
20th-century African-American people
20th-century African-American women